John Michael Hancock (1928–2004), known professionally as Jake, was a geologist with particular interests in chalk and the Cretaceous Period.

Biography

Hancock was born on 10 August 1928 in Salisbury, Wiltshire, educated at Dauntsey's School near Devizes and was a national serviceman in the Royal Air Force between 1947 and 1949, before going to the University of Cambridge to read geology and petrology as an undergraduate.

He graduated in 1952 and stayed on to work for his doctorate under the supervision of Maurice Black. His thesis was entitled The marginal facies of the British Chalk and in 1955 he joined the junior academic staff at King's College, London. He became Senior Lecturer in 1970 and Reader in 1977.

In 1986 he moved to Imperial College London where he was awarded the 1989 Lyell Medal of the Geological Society of London and retired in 1993 to Shaftesbury but continued to teach at Imperial as Emeritus Professor.

He was also an erudite teacher, bringing all aspects of science and general life to bear on his subject; one of his more generalist themes for the undergraduate geologist, being "How can the study of gardening benefit the geologist?". He also had a long time commitment to the Working Men's College in North London.

His contributions included over 110 scientific papers in English and French and a pursuit of the study of the relationship between geology and viniculture.

He died of cancer on 4 March 2004. He was the subject of a memorial volume of the Proceedings of the Geologists' Association in 2006 (Vol 117, Part 2), on which some of this article is based.

References

External links
 Geological Society of London. John Michael (Jake) Hancock

1928 births
2004 deaths
20th-century British geologists
People from Salisbury
Academics of King's College London
Academics of Imperial College London
Deaths from cancer in England
Lyell Medal winners
Alumni of Queens' College, Cambridge
People educated at Dauntsey's School
Presidents of the Geologists' Association